Martín García and Sebastián Prieto were the defending champions, but chose not to participate that year.

Agustín Calleri and Luis Horna won in the final 6–0, 6–7(6–8), [10–2], against Werner Eschauer and Peter Luczak.

Seeds

Draw

Draw

External links
 Main Draw

Doubles